Collins was a Major League Baseball right fielder who played in one game for St. Louis Browns on September 12, .

Collins, whose first name is unknown, went hitless in two at bats, with two strikeouts.

External links

Retrosheet

St. Louis Browns (NL) players
Major League Baseball right fielders
Year of birth missing
Year of death missing